Tuxedo station is a stop on the Metro-North Railroad's Port Jervis Line, serving the community of Tuxedo, New York, and the gated village of Tuxedo Park, New York, with commuter rail to Hoboken and its connections to New York City.

Station layout and structure
The station has one track and a low-level side platform. It is the only stop along the line that retains the old station at the current station site. It was built in 1885 as one of the original Tuxedo Park buildings, designed by architect Bruce Price, and was listed as Tuxedo Park Railroad Station on the National Register of Historic Places in 2000. It contains a waiting room and a community room often used by the Boy/Girl Scouts and other Tuxedo clubs and organizations.

In 2009 the town, which owns the building, spent $1 million to restore it to what historians believe was its original appearance. The train station currently displays artwork by long-time Tuxedo Park resident and artist Robert Bero. The pieces, a gift from the his estate, include woodcuts, etchings and drawings.

References

External links

 Station House from Google Maps Street View

Metro-North Railroad stations in New York (state)
National Register of Historic Places in Orange County, New York
Railway stations on the National Register of Historic Places in New York (state)
Railway stations in Orange County, New York
Railway stations in the United States opened in 1841
Former Erie Railroad stations
NJ Transit Rail Operations stations
Bruce Price buildings
1841 establishments in New York (state)